Västanfjärd is a former municipality of Finland. On January 1, 2009, it was consolidated with Dragsfjärd and Kimito to form the new municipality of Kimitoön.

It is located in the province of Western Finland and is part of the Southwest Finland region. The municipality had a population of 812 (2004-12-31) and covered an area of 96.62 km2 (excluding sea) of which 0.69 km2 is inland water. The population density was 8.46 inhabitants per km2.

The municipality was bilingual, with majority being Swedish and minority Finnish speakers.

External links 

 Official website – in Swedish and Finnish

Populated places disestablished in 2009
2009 disestablishments in Finland
Former municipalities of Finland
Kimitoön